Melanie Easter is a British paralympic swimmer, runner and more recently a cyclist. She represented the United Kingdom as a swimmer at the 1996 and 2000 Paralympic games. She won a gold and silver for events at the 1996 games in Atlanta, and gold, silver and bronze medals for at the Sydney Paralympics in 2000. Additionally an accomplished runner, Easter took up cycling competitively in 2007, and the following year competed in the World Triathlon Championships in Vancouver where she attained a gold.

Easter grew up in the Warwickshire town of Kenilworth and attended Exhall Grange School, a school for visually impaired students near Coventry. Easter; the pink house at the school is named after her. She has a degree from the University of Birmingham.

References

External links

Living people
Year of birth missing (living people)
Sportspeople from Warwickshire
People educated at Exhall Grange School
Alumni of the University of Birmingham
English female freestyle swimmers
British female medley swimmers
British female butterfly swimmers
Paralympic swimmers of Great Britain
Paralympic gold medalists for Great Britain
Paratriathletes of Great Britain
World record holders in paralympic swimming
British female triathletes
Medalists at the 1996 Summer Paralympics
Medalists at the 2000 Summer Paralympics
Swimmers at the 1996 Summer Paralympics
Swimmers at the 2000 Summer Paralympics
Paralympic medalists in swimming
S12-classified Paralympic swimmers
Medalists at the World Para Swimming Championships
20th-century British women